The Intercity Materieel or ICM (English – Intercity Material or Intercity Rolling Stock) is an electric multiple unit (EMU) train type operated by the Nederlandse Spoorwegen in the Netherlands. The train received the nickname Koploper, because it had a so-called "walk through head". After these trains were modernized, the "walk through heads" were removed. The modernized train sets are referred to as Intercity Materieel Modern (ICMm). 

The prototypes were built in 1977, with full-scale production lasting from 1983 to 1994 by Talbot. The first train sets came into service in 1977. The trains run daily on the Dutch rail network and, together with the VIRM, form the most important equipment on services connecting the Randstad with the rest of the country.

Names
 Intercity Materieel
 Koploper
 ICM
 ICMm

ICM is short for "Intercity Materieel", which means "Intercity rolling stock". The "m" in ICMm indicates that it is modernized.

General information
The trains are designed for long-distance intercity services. Their maximum allowed operating speed is 140km/h, although their engines are designed to reach a top speed of 180km/h. Their cabs are on the roof, which initially allowed through gangways between sets when coupled together, though the gangways were removed during their refurbishment, as they were deemed too unreliable. Refurbishment of sets began in late 2006 and was completed in 2011. The trains have compartments in the 1st class accommodation.

Subseries

ICM-0
In 1977, a prototype batch numbered 4001–4007 were delivered. They first operated between Eindhoven and Venlo and then later between Amsterdam and Nijmegen. These were taken out of service in 2003, as NS considered them to be too expensive to keep running.

ICM-1 and ICM-2
These were numbered 4011–4097 and were first introduced into service in 1983. All were delivered by 1990. These had been adjusted to remove the faults of the ICM-0. 4051–4097 are Thyristor controlled.

ICM-3 and ICM-4
Between 1990 and 1994, 50 4-car units were delivered, numbered 4201 – 4250. These have track brakes. Between 1996 and 2007, unit 4231 had a full coach converted to 1st class and was renumbered 4444. This unit only operated one train a day between Groningen and The Hague. It has since been converted back to a regular carriage, but it continued carrying number 4444 at first. After its revision in 2011, this unit was given its original number (4231) back.

Walk through head

The train's name Koploper means "Frontrunner" but the name can also be seen as a reference to "walking through the head" ("Headwalker"(Dutch: "Doorloopkop")). When ICM units joined, the doors at the end of the train would open, and a walkway would emerge, coupling with the other set and allowing passengers and crew to walk through to the next set. (This makes it easy for conductors to check tickets and check on the security of the passengers. In addition, each set had catering cars before they were abolished in 2003). Starting from 2005 these gangways were no longer used. The reason given was that they were not often used, but they also had many technical problems that made the trains late on a regular basis. During their refurbishment from 2006 onwards, these hallways were permanently sealed shut and the doors at the heads of the train were replaced by a light polyester plate, saving the NS maintenance costs.

Refurbishment and renewal

From November 2006, the Koploper went through a process of refurbishment. The first train left NedTrain's workshop in Haarlem in April 2007 and then put into the regular service. To distinguish the not yet modernized sets from the modernized sets, modernized train sets are referred to as ICMm. These sets feature new interiors with 13% more seats. One could distinguish apparent differences between 1st and 2nd class. The first class consists of red seats and second class consists of blue seats, equal to SGMm units. Other improvement include the addition of a wheelchair toilet, air conditioning, OBIS, and digital travel information. On the exterior, the train sets were repainted showing blue window surrounds curving at the ends of units. Numbers are now nearer the front of the train. The connectors diverting the train compartments were revealed and digital destination screens were put at the trains ends. The renewal of the series 4011–4097 was completed in June 2010. Refurbishing and renewing of the 4-car units took place between February 2010 and July 2011.

Adverts

Between 1986 and 2002 many sets featured adverts.

 In 1986, in relation to the opening of the Amsterdam–Schiphol railway line, two units were painted in the colours of airplanes; 4011 was painted in KLM colours and 4012 in the colours of Martinair
 4011, 4012 and 4024 were painted in the colours of Aegon
 4050 was painted in the colours of Randstad and later in De Lage Landen colours
 4023 advertised the Groninger Museum, but in NS colours from 1999; this train had white doors at the end and also featured altered interiors
 4028 was temporarily stickered as a Children's Book Week Train in 2004
 4201, 4240 and 4241 had Orange Olympic adverts, which featured sportsman on the side of the train. VIRM 9520 and 9525 also featured Orange Olympic adverts; during the refurbishments, these adverts were removed

Services operated

See also 
 E259 series trains featuring a similar design

Gallery

Electric multiple units of the Netherlands
Waggonfabrik Talbot
1500 V DC multiple units of the Netherlands